Rossarden is a rural locality in the local government areas (LGA) of Northern Midlands (89%) and Break O'Day (11%) in the Central and North-east LGA regions of Tasmania. The 2016 census recorded a population of 42 for the state suburb of Rossarden.

History 
Rossarden was gazetted as a locality in 1973.

It is an old mining town in north-east Tasmania, located 19 km from Avoca and within sight of Ben Lomond. 

The town came into being primarily as a result of the tin mining operations of Aberfoyle Tin Mining Company, N.L which created a demand for employees.

The town is located in a valley below Stacks Bluff (1527 m) and it is an old tin mining town, though the mine closed in 1982. Prior to this Rossarden was one of Australia's major tin producing towns. The main road into and out of the town is Rossarden Road.

According to the 2011 census, this number had grown to 301 people.

In 2008 an irregularity in the deed paperwork belonging to the residents of Rossarden was discovered. It was discovered that each resident actually owned the house next door to their own. The irregularity has since been corrected by the State Government.

By 1933 the town was said to be growing steadily with a town hall, a post office, and 17 dwellings built in a matter of months, while a community ball was reported to have been arranged in order to raise funds for a tennis and badminton court. The post office opened on 20 November 1933.

Nearby locations include Storeys Creek, where there was a wolfram mine, Fingal and Avoca.  The town's decline was captured in the Weddings Parties Anything song "Rossarden".

A book was written about the town in 2004 focusing on the stories of former residents. There are also various books written about the mineralogy in the area.

In recent times there has been a campaign to draw tourists to the area.

In 2016 plans for a new base station that would better serve mobile telephone coverage in the Rossarden area were revealed.

Geography
Almost all the boundaries are survey lines. Storys Creek, a tributary of the South Esk River, flows through from north to south.

Road infrastructure 
Route B42 (Rossarden Road) runs through from south to north-east.

References

Mining towns in Tasmania
Towns in Tasmania
Localities of Northern Midlands Council
Localities of Break O'Day Council